The SSCV Thialf is a huge semi-submersible crane vessel operated by Heerema Marine Contractors, and it was the largest crane vessel in the world until the  became the largest in 2019.

History
The ship was constructed in 1985 as DB-102 for McDermott International by Mitsui Engineering & Shipbuilding Co., Ltd. In 1997, it was taken over by Heerema Marine Contractors after discontinuation of their joint venture with McDermott, HeereMac, and renamed Thialf.

Layout
The Thialf has two cranes with a combined maximum lifting capacity of 14,200 metric tons.

It is equipped with a class III dynamic positioning system. Propulsion and position keeping is by six 5,500 kW retractable azimuthing thrusters. For shallow waters there are 12 Flipper Delta anchors, 22.5 t, with 2,500 meter, 80 mm mooring wire.

The hull consists of two pontoons with four columns each. Transit draught is about 12 metres. This way the pontoons (with a draught of 13.6 metres) are well submerged to reduce the effect of waves and swell.

It is able to accommodate 736 people.

Lightship weight is 72,484 t.

Noteworthy projects
 Installing the pylon of the Erasmus Bridge in 1995.
 Decommissioning of the Brent Spar in 1998.
 In 2000 it set a world record of 11,883 t by lifting Shell's Shearwater topsides, beaten by Saipem 7000 in 2004 with the Sabratha deck lifting of 12,150 t.
 In 2004 it installed the topsides on BP's Holstein, at the time the world's largest spar. The lift was a record for the Gulf of Mexico: 7,810 t. The current record for Gulf of Mexico is now held by the Saipem 7000 with the 9,521 t of PEMEX PB-KU-A2 deck installed in March 2007.
 In 2005 it installed the heaviest single piece foundation piles: 2.74 meters diameter x 190 meters long, weighing 818 t each for Chevron's Benguela Belize compliant tower.
 In 2009 the ship became involved in the Alpha Ventus project, the first German offshore windfarm.
 2017-2018: The Thialf was involved in the installation of the platform sections of the Johan Sverdrup Complex—part of the development of the Johan Sverdrup oil field.

Footnotes

External links
 Heerema's Thialf page
 Actual position, status, weather and other updates from SSCV Thialf
 offshore-vessels.net/thialf
 Current position and photos of SSCV Thialf at Digital-Seas.com

Ships built by Mitsui Engineering and Shipbuilding
Ships of the Netherlands
Crane vessels
Semi-submersibles
1985 ships